Gamarra is a Spanish surname. Notable people with the surname include:

Agustín Gamarra (1785–1841), 13th President of Peru
Ronald Gamarra Herrera, Peruvian politician and lawyer
Carlos Gamarra Ugaz, Peruvian politician and attorney
Pedro Sánchez Gamarra, Peruvian Minister of Energy and Mining 2008-present
Carlos Gamarra (born 1971), Paraguayan footballer
Fredy José Bareiro Gamarra (born 1982), Paraguayan footballer
Óscar Gamarra (born 1987), Paraguayan footballer
Celso Fabián Ortíz Gamarra (born 1989), Paraguayan footballer
Roberto Gamarra (footballer born 1981), Paraguayan footballer
Rodolfo Gamarra (born 1988), Paraguayan footballer
Roberto Gamarra (coach) (born 1958), Argentine and naturalised Paraguayan footballer and coach
Daniel Gamarra (born 1978), Uruguayan footballer
José Gamarra (born 1934), Uruguayan artist
Pierre Gamarra (1919–2009), French writer